Juab County is a county in western Utah, United States. As of the 2010 United States Census, the population was 10,246. Its county seat and largest city is Nephi.

Juab County is part of the Provo–Orem, Utah Metropolitan Statistical Area, which is also included in the Salt Lake City–Provo–Orem, Utah Combined Statistical Area.

History
The area of future Juab County was inhabited by nomadic indigenous peoples before the Mormon settlement of Utah beginning in 1847. Soon after, Mormons and others traveling through the area had established a road to California, leading SSW from Great Salt Lake City. It passed Salt Creek, flowing westward through a slough in the Wasatch Mountains. The area around this creek was often used as a stopping or camping spot by travelers, and by 1851 Mormon settlers had begun a settlement in the area. When the Utah Territory legislature created a county (by partitioning territory from Utah County) to oversee the growth and organization of the largely uninhabited and unbearable area, this settlement (called Salt Creek) was the only real settlement worthy of the name, and it was designated as the county seat in a 3 March 1852 legislative act. The new county's description included considerable territory falling in present-day Nevada. The county name reportedly derived from a Native American word meaning thirsty valley, or possibly only valley.

The county's boundaries were altered in 1854, 1855, and 1856. Also, in 1856 the Territory legislature, acknowledging the upcoming establishment of Nevada Territory, removed from the boundary description of Juab county all territories west of 114 degrees longitude. Further boundary adjustments were made in 1861, 1862, 1866, 1870, in 1888, and 1913. A small adjustment between Juab and Sanpete counties on March 8, 1919, created the current Juab County configuration.

Early settlers in Salt Creek devoted themselves to agriculture and livestock. However, by 1869 mining of precious metals had begun in the Tintic region. Mining towns, including Diamond, Silver City, and Eureka, appeared. By 1889 it was considered one of the nation's most productive mining areas. Mining continued as the dominant economic driver through the mid-twentieth century, then subsided. Salt Creek grew apace, although in 1882 the town name (and US Post Office designation) was changed to "Nephi".

Politics and government
Juab has traditionally voted Republican. In only one national election since 1948 the county selected the Democratic Party candidate.

Geography
Juab County lies on the west side of Utah. Its west border abuts the east border of the state of Nevada. Its planar areas consist of rugged, arid semi-arable fine-grain soil, with hills and low mountains. Its eastern border is loosely defined by the ridgeline of an arm of the Wasatch Mountains. The terrain generally slopes to the north, with its highest point on Mount Ibapah, a crest of the East Central Great Basin Range in northwest Juab County. The listed elevation of Mt. Ibapah is 12,087' (3684m) ASL. The county's shape bears resemblance to the shape of Massachusetts.

Airports
 Nephi Municipal Airport (NPH)

Highways

 Interstate 15
 U.S. Route 6
 Utah State Route 28
 Utah State Route 36
 Utah State Route 78
 Utah State Route 132

Adjacent counties

 Tooele County - north
 Utah County - northeast
 Sanpete County - southeast
 Millard County - south
 White Pine County, Nevada - west

Protected areas

 Deep Creek Wildlife Management Area
 Fish Springs National Wildlife Refuge
 Fishlake National Forest (part)
 Mona Front Wildlife Management Area
 Triangle Ranch Wildlife Management Area
 Uinta-Wasatch-Cache National Forest (part)
 Yuba State Park (part)
 Yuba Lake State Recreation Area

Lakes

 Andys Pond
 Antelope Springs
 Baker Hot Springs
 Big Spring
 Bittner Knoll Reservoir
 Blue Springs
 Brough Reservoir
 Burraston Ponds
 Cane Springs
 CCC Reservoir
 Cherry Creek Reservoir
 Chicken Creek Reservoir
 Coyote Knoll Reservoir
 Crater Bench Reservoir
 Dead Horse Tank
 Desert Mountain Reservoir
 Dog Valley Reservoir
 East Dugway Reservoir
 East Topaz Reservoir
 East Topaz 2 Reservoir
 Fish Springs
 Avocet Pool
 Crater Spring
 Curlew Pool
 Deadman Spring
 Egret Pool
 Gadwall Pool
 Harrison Pool
 House Springs
 Ibis Pool
 Lost Spring
 Mallard Pool
 Middle Spring
 Mirror Spring
 North Springs
 Percy Spring
 Pintail Pool
 Shoveler Pool
 South Springs
 Thomas Springs
 Walter Spring
 Hogback Reservoir
 Hole in Rock Reservoir
 Hole-in-the-Wall Reservoir
 Irons Reservoir
 Laird Spring
 Lime Spring
 Little Red Cedar Spring
 Lower Topaz Reservoir
 Mile Pond
 Molten Spring
 Mona Reservoir
 Monument Reservoir
 Mud Lake Reservoir
 Mud Springs
 North Sugarville Reservoir
 Picture Rock Reservoir
 Picture Rock Wash Reservoir
 Rain Lake
 River Bed Reservoir
 River Bed Reservoir Number 2
 Roadside Reservoir (near Boyd Station)
 Roadside Reservoir (in the Tule Valley)
 South Desert Mountain Reservoir
 Studhorse Springs
 Swasey Point Reservoir
 Table Knoll Reservoir
 Trough Spring
 West Fork Reservoir
 Yuba Lake (or Sevier Bridge Reservoir)(partially)

Demographics
As of July 1, 2018, the US Census Bureau estimates that there were 11,555 people and 3,557 housing units in the county. The population density was 3.12/sqmi (1.21/km2). There were 3,066 households. The racial makeup of the county was 96.4% White, 0.4% Black or African American, 1.0% Native American, 0.4% Asian, 0.2% Pacific Islander, and 1.5% from two or more races. 4.7% of the population were Hispanic or Latino of any race.

In 2010, there were 3,093 households, out of which 47.8% had children under the age of 18 living with them, 68.50% were married couples living together, 8.80% had a female householder with no husband present, and 19.40% were non-families. 17.30% of all households, the householder lived alone. The average household size was 3.27, and the average family size was 3.74.

The county population contained 40.1% of 19 and younger, 5.0% from 20 to 24, 24.80% from 25 to 44, 20.1% from 45 to 64, and 10.2% who were 65 years of age or older. The median age was 29.3 years. 51% of the population was male, and 49% was female.

The median income for a household in the county was $56,976. The per capita income for the county was $18,503 and 11.4% of the population were below the poverty line.

Education
Two school districts serve the county:
 Juab School District, serving the Juab Valley area on the eastern end of the county
 Tintic School District, serving the remaining western part of the county

Communities

Cities
 Eureka
 Mona
 Nephi (county seat)
 Santaquin (part)

Towns
 Levan
 Rocky Ridge

Unincorporated communities
 Callao
 Goshute
 Ironton
 Juab
 Mammoth
 Mills
 Partoun
 Red Point
 Sharp
 Starr
 Tintic Junction
 Trout Creek

Ghost towns
 Chicken Creek
 Diamond
 Jericho
 Joy
 Knightsville
 Silver City

See also

 List of counties in Utah
 National Register of Historic Places listings in Juab County, Utah

References

External links

 Juab County website
 Juab County Fair website
 Juab County Sheriff's Office website
 Juab Travel Council website
 Ghost Towns of Juab County (on ghosttowns.com)

 
 
Utah placenames of Native American origin
1852 establishments in Utah Territory
Populated places established in 1852